The Foyle, Carlingford and Irish Lights Commission (FCILC) is a commission supervised by the North/South Ministerial Council with responsibility for two agencies which span the Irish border, namely the Loughs Agency and the Lights Agency. The FCIC is one of the implementation bodies (or "cross-border bodies") established in 1999 under the 1998 British–Irish Agreement during the Northern Ireland peace process.

Lights Agency
The Lights Agency is intended to succeed the Commissioners of Irish Lights in managing lighthouses around the coast of Ireland; however, this process has been stalled by administrative and legal complications.

Loughs Agency
The Loughs Agency (Ulster Scots: Factrie fur Loughs) manages fisheries in Carlingford Lough and Lough Foyle — the sea loughs at the southeastern and northwestern ends respectively of the land border between Northern Ireland and the Republic of Ireland — as well as the basin of the River Foyle, which forms part of the border and flows into Lough Foyle. The Loughs Agency is the successor of the Foyle Fisheries Commission, established in 1952 by the Government of Ireland and the Government of Northern Ireland to bypass their dispute over which had sovereignty over Lough Foyle and the river channel.

References

Sources

Citations

External links
 Foyle, Carlingford and Irish Lights Commission, on the North/South Ministerial Council website
 Loughs Agency official website

British–Irish Agreement implementation bodies

Lighthouse organizations
Water transport in Ireland
Fishing in Ireland
Fisheries protection